Siddiq or Siddique from the Arabic word صدّيق meaning "truthful") is an Islamic term and is given as an honorific title to certain individuals. The feminine gender for Siddiq is Siddiqah.

People

Title
Abu Bakr Siddiq (c. 573 – 634), the first Muslim Caliph following Prophet Muhammad's death. He ruled as khalifa 632 to 634
Shah Siddiq (also rendered Siddik, Siddiky, Siddiqi, Siddiquee), 14th-century Sufi saint and one of the 360 auliyas or followers who accompanied Shah Jalal

Given name
Siddiq Baloch (1940–2018), Pakistani journalist and senior political economist
Siddiq Barmak (born 1962), Afghan film director and producer
Siddiq Durimi (born 1988), Singaporean footballer
Siddiq Ismail (born 1954) Pakistani Hamd and Na`at reciter
Siddiq Khan (umpire), a Pakistani cricket umpire
Siddiq Khan Kanju (died 2001), Pakistani politician and Minister of State for Foreign Affairs
Siddiq Hasan Khan (1832–1890), celebrated and controversial leader of India's Muslim community in the 19th-century
Siddiq Manzul (1932–2003), Sudanese footballer
Siddique Salik (1935–1988), general in the Pakistan Army, combat artist, humorist, novelist, and a memoirist

Middle name
Faiyaz Siddiq Koya, Fijian politician, Member of the Parliament of Fiji and government minister
Mohamed Siddiq El-Minshawi (1920–1969), Egyptian Qur'anic reciter
Mohammad Siddiq Chakari (born 1961), Afghan politician
Muhammad Siddiq Khan (1910-1978), Bangladeshi academic and librarian
Haji Mohammad Siddiq Choudri (1912-2004), Pakistani admiral in the Pakistan Navy

Surname
Arfa Siddiq (born 1987), Pakistani politician and leader of the Pashtun Tahafuz Movement
E. A. Siddiq full Ebrahimali Abubacker Siddiq (born 1937), Indian agricultural scientist
Ismail Siddiq (1830–1876), Egyptian politician
Kashif Siddiq (born 1981), Pakistani cricketer 
Majdi Siddiq (born 1985), Qatari footballer of Sudanese descent
Mohammad Siddiq (born 1979), Pakistani cricketer
Mohammad Yusuf Siddiq (born 1957), Bangladeshi epigraphist
Muhammad Siddique (born 1948), Pakistani middle-distance runner
Suhaila Siddiq (1949–2020), Afghan politician
Tulip Siddiq (born 1982), British Labour Party politician
Umar Siddiq (born 1992), Pakistani cricketer

Fiction
Siddiq (The Walking Dead), a fictional character from the comic book series The Walking Dead and the television series of the same name

See also
Sadek (disambiguation)
Sadeq (disambiguation)
Sadiq (disambiguation)
Sadegh (disambiguation)
Siddique (disambiguation)